Stanevce is a village located in the municipality of Preševo, Serbia. According to the 2002 census, the village has a population of 68 people. Of these, 67 (98,52 %) were ethnic Albanians, and 1 (1,47 %) Bosniak.

References

Populated places in Pčinja District
Albanian communities in Serbia